242 Summer Avenue is a historic house located in Reading, Massachusetts. It is locally significant as a well-preserved example of a Shingle style house.

Description and history 
The two-story wood-frame house was built in 1912; it has irregular massing with a hip roof. There are two gable-topped pavilions framing a central section of the front facade, which have roof sections extending to the sides of the house that shelter porches (the front entry to the right, a sitting porch to the left). First-floor windows on the pavilions are grouped in a way reminiscent of Prairie style design.

The house was listed on the National Register of Historic Places on July 19, 1984.

See also
National Register of Historic Places listings in Reading, Massachusetts
National Register of Historic Places listings in Middlesex County, Massachusetts

References

Houses on the National Register of Historic Places in Reading, Massachusetts
Shingle Style houses
Houses in Reading, Massachusetts
Houses completed in 1912
Shingle Style architecture in Massachusetts